The Colonial Secretary of the Gambia was a key role in the colonial government of the Gambia Colony and Protectorate. Often seen as the deputy to the governor or colonial administrator, Colonial Secretaries often stepped in as acting governors through the Gambia's colonial history. The Colonial Secretary was in charge of administration, and was often a career Colonial Office official.

Role 
In the British Empire, Colonial Secretaries served as the chief administrative officers of the colonies to which they were posted. They were responsible for conducting the business of the Governor with the various Government Departments and also with the colonists, collectively and individually. The Colonial Secretary was a member of both the Executive and Legislative Councils. Often, Colonial Secretaries became responsible for a variety of functions, including customs, post offices, shipping, harbours, prisons, and natives. The Colonial Secretary often also dealt directly with England. The role was often quite flexible depending on the Governor, as the Colonial Office was reluctant to define the role precisely, fearing it would become redundant.

List of Colonial Secretaries

References 

Gambia
History of the Gambia